The Achilles 24 is a British sailboat that was designed by Oliver Lee and Chris Butler as a cruiser-racer and first built in 1968.

The Achilles 24 is a development of the open Ajax.

Production
The design was built by Butler Moldings in the United Kingdom, but it is now out of production. A number of boats were also constructed by amateur builders from kits supplied by Butler.

Design
The Achilles 24 is a recreational keelboat, built predominantly of fiberglass, with teak wood trim. It has a masthead sloop rig, with a deck-stepped mast, a spooned raked stem, a vertical transom, a skeg-mounted rudder controlled by a tiller and a fixed fin keel or optional triple keel. It displaces  and carries  of ballast.

The triple keel allows beaching the boat in an upright position. The manufacturer claims that the triple keel only exacts a 3% performance penalty. However Yachting Monthly magazine reported in 2009, "Butler competed in AZAB and OSTAR races in the Achilles 24, which featured a bulbed fin keel. This gave the boat quite respectable speed and windward performance but a triple-keeled, shoal draught version was much more pedestrian."

The boat was initially fitted with a small outboard motor, with an inboard gasoline engine optional for docking and maneuvering. Many were retro-fitted with diesel engines.

Early production boats had three cabin windows, but this was later changed to a single long window.

Accommodations in the narrow-beam boat include two quarter berths and a forward "V"-berth, with a chemical head under the "V"-berth. It has a split galley, with a port side double sink and a starboard side two-burner stove. An anchor well is provide in the bow on boats after about serial number 250.

Operational history
The designer, Butler raced the boat in the Azores and Back (AZAB) Yacht Race and Observer Single-handed Trans-Atlantic Race (OSTAR) races.

In a 2009 review, Yachting Monthly magazine said, "factory-built boats were sound, strong but simple. The quality of the many home-built models will be variable."

See also
List of sailing boat types

Similar sailboats
Atlantic City catboat
Balboa 24
C&C 24
C&C SR 25
Challenger 24
Columbia 24
Dana 24
Islander 24
Islander 24 Bahama
J/24
MacGregor 24
Mirage 24
Northern 1/4 Ton
Nutmeg 24
San Juan 24
Seidelmann 245
Shark 24
Tonic 23

References

Keelboats
1960s sailboat type designs
Sailing yachts
Sailboat type designs by Oliver Lee
Sailboat type designs by Chris Butler
Sailboat types built by Butler Moldings